The Sealed Knot is a British historical association and charity, with many members from outside the United Kingdom,  dedicated to costumed reenactment of battles and events surrounding the English Civil War.

About
The Sealed Knot takes its name from the original Sealed Knot, a secret association aimed at the restoration of the monarchy, although the modern incarnation has none of the political affiliations of its namesake.  Apart from reenactment, it is also involved in research into the history of the Civil War, and education (at the school or college level) about the same.

History
The Sealed Knot was founded by Brigadier Peter Young, who was a military historian and a Second World War veteran. The idea of the Sealed Knot re-enactment group started at a dinner party with a small group of friends on 28 February 1968 following the publication of "Edgehill 1642 – the Campaign and the Battle". Within a few months it had 200 members and today has a membership of several thousand, making it the largest re-enactment society in Europe. The group is a registered charity, and has its own coat of arms.

With its large membership and high profile the Sealed Knot is the largest and best known of all the many re-enactment and historical groups and societies in the UK. Its official journal, Orders of the Day, is published every three months and sent to all members. It contains information about forthcoming events. Copies of every issue are lodged with the British Library.

The Sealed Knot comprises a number of regiments split into Parliamentarian, Royalist and Scots armies. The group was responsible for the first commemoration in 1971 of the Battle of Nantwich (which originally took place in 1644) and in 1973 the Sealed Knot staged the first re-enactment of the battle, which has now become an annual event at the end of January and is known as "Holly Holy Day".

Regiments

The Sealed Knot is made up of smaller groups, each run semi-autonomously, and known to their members as "regiments", their names and identities closely linked to regiments that took part in the English Civil War. Each of these regiments falls under one of the armies of the society: the Royalist Army, the Army of Parliament and the Army of Ireland and Scotland. The other sections are those who deal with pyrotechnics, the medical service, the living history group and Friends of the Knot.
 There are two different types of regiment – "foote" are infantry with pikemen and musketeers, while "horse" are regiments of cavalry. The Thomas Rainsborough Company took part in the opening ceremony for a plaque commemorating the burial of Thomas Rainsborough in Wapping on 12 May 2013.

Parliament
The Army of Parliament is divided into four Brigades, each made up of regiments, bands and dragoones. In addition there are three units that report directly to the Lord General: Sir William Waller’s Lifeguard of Horse, Oakey’s Dragoons, and the trayne of Artillery. The Lord General heads the Army. He is assisted by his Staff, who range from the Chief of Staff to humble runners. The following list shows the regiments in each brigade:

Parody
The Sealed Knot is parodied as "The Peeled Nuts" in the Discworld series of novels by Terry Pratchett. It has also been parodied in Chris Morris' On The Hour, where it is referred to as "The Soiled Nut". Half Man Half Biscuit's song "Uffington Wassail" on their 2000 album Trouble over Bridgwater challenges the Society to re-enact "Luton Town – Millwall, nineteen eighty-five", a notorious incident of football hooliganism involving rival supporters.

See also
 List of historical reenactment groups
 English Civil War reenactment
 English Civil War Society

Notes

References

Official website
National Association of Re-Enactment Societies

Historical reenactment groups
English Civil War reenactment
Organizations established in 1968